Frank O'Connor (1903–1966) was an Irish author.

Frank O'Connor may also refer to:

 Frank O'Connor (actor) (1881–1959), American actor, director and screenwriter
 Frank O'Connor (basketball), Irish Olympic basketball player
 Charles Francis "Frank" O'Connor (1897–1979), American actor, rancher, and painter, husband of Ayn Rand
 Frank D. O'Connor (1909–1992), American politician from New York City
 Frank O'Connor (baseball) (1868–1913), American baseball pitcher
 Frank Patrick O'Connor (1885–1939), Canadian politician, businessman, and founder of Laura Secord Chocolates
 Frank O'Connor (rugby league) (1906–1964), Australian rugby league footballer
 SS Frank O'Connor (1892–1919), a 1919 shipwreck in Lake Michigan
 Frank O'Connor (public servant) (1894–1972), senior Australian public servant
 Frank O'Connor (Australian rules footballer) (1923–2017), Australian rules footballer for Melbourne
 Raymond O'Connor (footballer) (1913–1980), also known as Frank, English footballer

See also 
 Francis O'Connor (disambiguation)